Stephen Edwin Yarnold (9 August 1903 – 25 September 1978) was an Australian army chaplain and Presbyterian minister. Yarnold was born in Ramsgate, Kent, England and died in Silvan, Victoria.

See also

 Francis Ormond
 Colin Macdonald Gilray
 Arthur Augustus Calwell

References

Australian Army chaplains
Australian Presbyterian ministers
Uniting Church in Australia people
Australian people of English descent
Australian people of Scottish descent
1903 births
1978 deaths